Thomas Joseph Scully (September 19, 1868 – December 14, 1921) was an American Democratic Party politician who represented New Jersey's 3rd congressional district for five terms from 1911 to 1921.

Biography
Scully was born in South Amboy, New Jersey on September 19, 1868. He attended the public schools, and Seton Hall College in South Orange, New Jersey. He engaged in the marine towing and transportation business. Scully was a member of the board of education from 1893 to 1895 and served as the Mayor of South Amboy, New Jersey in 1909 and 1910. He was elected as a Democrat to the 62nd United States Congress and to the four succeeding Congresses, serving in office from March 4, 1911 to March 4, 1921.

He was a delegate to the 1912 Democratic National Convention. After he left Congress, he served again mayor of South Amboy, from 1921 until his death in that city on December 14, 1921. He was interred in St. Mary's Cemetery, South Amboy, New Jersey.

References

External links

Thomas Joseph Scully at The Political Graveyard

1864 births
1921 deaths
People from South Amboy, New Jersey
Seton Hall University alumni
Democratic Party members of the United States House of Representatives from New Jersey
Mayors of South Amboy, New Jersey